George Holden Tinkham (October 29, 1870 – August 28, 1956) was a member of the United States House of Representatives from the state of Massachusetts.

Early years
Tinkham was born October 29, 1870, in Boston, Massachusetts, to Frances Ann Holden and George Henry Tinkham, a produce dealer. He graduated from Harvard College in 1894.

Career
Tinkham served as a member of the Boston Common Council in 1897 and 1898.  After this first venture into politics he resumed his education at Harvard Law School.  He was admitted to the bar in 1899 and commenced practice in Boston.  Tinkham returned to public office, serving as a member of the Boston Board of Aldermen from 1900 to 1902.

Tinkham spent the next several years working as a lawyer. In 1910 he returned to public service, being elected as a member of the Massachusetts State Senate, where he served from 1910 to 1912.

During World War I, he served in the military; Tinkham would later tell Life magazine that while touring the front as a Congressman he fired the first American shot against the Austrians.

Tinkham was elected as a Republican to the Sixty-fourth Congress and to the thirteen succeeding Congresses (March 4, 1915 – January 3, 1943). During that time Tinkham was nicknamed "the conscience of the House" for his efforts to protect voting rights for African Americans, in part by highlighting of the South's disproportionate representation in the House related to that region's voting population.

Tinkham did not stand for renomination in 1942.  He continued to practice law in Boston until his retirement; died in Cramerton, North Carolina, on August 28, 1956; interment in Forest Hills Cemetery in Boston.

In his spare time, he went on safaris in Kenya.

See also
 131st Massachusetts General Court (1910)

Notes

References

External links
 

Massachusetts lawyers
Republican Party Massachusetts state senators
Boston City Council members
Republican Party members of the Massachusetts House of Representatives
1870 births
1956 deaths
Harvard College alumni
Republican Party members of the United States House of Representatives from Massachusetts
People from South End, Boston
Military personnel from Massachusetts